Base Aérea de Salvador – BASV  is a base of the Brazilian Air Force, located in Salvador da Bahia, Brazil.

It shares some facilities with Dep. Luís Eduardo Magalhães International Airport.

History
Salvador Air Force Base was created on 5 November 1942 by Decree no. 4,916.

Units
Since January 2017 there are no permanent flying units assigned to Salvador Air Force Base. Whenever needed, the aerodrome is used as a support facility to other air units of the Brazilian Air Force, Navy and Army.

Former Units
March 1947–January 2018: 1st Squadron of the 7th Aviation Group (1°/7°GAv) Orungan. The squadron was moved to Santa Cruz Air Force Base.

Access
The base is located 28 km from downtown Salvador da Bahia.

Accidents and incidents
11 July 1952: a Brazilian Air Force Douglas C-47A-35-DL registration FAB-2048 flying from Salvador da Bahia to Rio de Janeiro crashed following an engine fire. Thirteen of the 33 occupants died.
21 September 1959: a Brazilian Air Force Lockheed P-15 Neptune registration FAB-7007 operating a Search and Rescue mission for a missing aircraft crashed after take-off. The six occupants died.

Gallery
This gallery displays aircraft that have been based at Salvador Air Force Base. The gallery is not comprehensive.

See also
List of Brazilian military bases
Dep. Luis Eduardo Magalhães International Airport

References

External links

Bahia
Brazilian Air Force
Brazilian Air Force bases
Buildings and structures in Bahia
Salvador, Bahia